MasterChef Australia: The Professionals is an Australian cooking television show, based on the original BBC MasterChef: The Professionals. It aired on Network Ten from 20 January to 17 March 2013. The show was won by Rhys Badcock.

Contestants and elimination history 
Rhys was crowned the winner, while Sarah and Rhett were tied as Runners-up.

Episodes

Guest chefs
 Adriano Zumbo
 Jacques Reymond
 Stefano de Pieri
 Peter Gilmore
 Shannon Bennett
 Donovan Cooke
 Curtis Stone
 David Chang

Ratings
 Colour key:
  – Highest rating during the series
  – Lowest rating during the series

Notes
^N/A = not in top 20

International syndications

Accolades

References

External links
 Official website

MasterChef Australia
Australian cooking television series
2013 Australian television series debuts
2013 Australian television series endings
English-language television shows
Television shows set in Victoria (Australia)